Ali Fadakar, (born November 26, 1991 in Tehran) is an Iranian karateka. He began karate training at age 10, and after several champions of national karate championships, became member of Iran's karate national team in 2008. He has won 3 gold medals of 2009, 2012 and 2016 Junior and Senior World karate championships.

World Karate Championships 

 Austria, 2016, 🥇Gold Medal (Iran Team kumite - seniors)
 Morocco,  2009, 🥇Gold Medal (-76 kg - Juniors )
 France, 2012, 🥉 Bronze Medal (Iran Team kumite - seniors)

Asian Karate Championships 

 Uzbekistan, 2012, 🥇Gold Medal (-84kg - Seniors )
 Uzbekistan,  2015, 🥇Gold Medal ( Azad University Kumite Team - Seniors)
 Hongkong, 2010, 🥉 Bronze Medal (+78 kg - Under 21)

Karate 1 Premier League 

 Indonesia, 2012,🥇 Gold Medal (-84 kg - Seniors)
 Dubai, 2019,🥈 Silver Medal (-84 kg - Seniors)
 Turkey,  2012, 🥈 Silver Medal (-84 kg - Seniors)
 Dubai, 2018, 🥈 Silver Medal (-84 kg - Seniors)
 Turkey,  2017, 🥉 Bronze Medal (-84 kg - Seniors)
 Japan, 2014,🥉 Bronze Medal (-84 kg - Seniors)

International Karate Competitions 

 Switzerland, 2016, 🥇Gold Medal ( -84 kg - Basel Open Cup)
 Iran, 2016, 🥇Gold Medal (-84 kg - The International Solidarity & Friendship Championships - Seniors)

Academic Resume 

 Master Of Sport Psychology, Tehran University
 Bachelor Of Sport Science And Physical Education, Tehran University

References

External links 
 Ali Fadakar on WKF
 
 fadakar's instagram page
 
 
 Ali fadakar on linkedin

1991 births
Living people
Iranian male karateka
Sportspeople from Tehran
21st-century Iranian people